The 2019–20 Georgian Superliga is the 20th season of the Georgian Superliga since its establishment. Delta, renamed as Tskhum-Abkhazeti, were the defending champions.

On 13 March 2020, the league was postponed due to the coronavirus pandemic until 6 April. On May 26th Board of the Georgian Basketball Federation announced the cancellation of all basketball tournaments in Georgia.

Format
The regular season consisted of a double-legged round-robin competition where the eight best teams qualified for the playoffs.

Teams

Vera and Rustavi promoted to the league. Delta changed its name to Tskhum-Abkhazeti.

Regular season

League table

Results

Playoffs
All the rounds will be played in a best-of-five games format, (2-2-1) format.

Bracket

Quarter-finals

|}

Semi-finals

|}

Third place match

|}

Finals

|}

Relegation playoffs
The winner of the playoffs between the ninth qualified and the runner-up of the A-League will join the next Superleague season with the second-tier league champion.

References

External links
Official Georgian Basketball Federation website

Georgian Superliga seasons
Georgia
Superliga